= HD 130917 =

White-hued main sequence star in the constellation Boötes

Observation data Epoch J2000 Equinox ICRS
- Constellation: Boötes
- Right ascension: 14^{h} 49^{m} 58.39852^{s}
- Declination: +28° 36′ 56.9932″
- Apparent magnitude (V): 5.80

Characteristics
- Evolutionary stage: main sequence
- Spectral type: A4V
- U−B color index: 0.08
- B−V color index: 0.05

Astrometry
Radial velocity (R_{v})	+1.4±4.3 km/s
Proper motion (μ)	RA: +18.286 mas/yr Dec.: −0.634 mas/yr
Parallax (π)	9.7343±0.0386 mas
Distance	335 ± 1 ly (102.7 ± 0.4 pc)
Absolute magnitude (M_{V})	+0.84

Details
Mass	2.2 M_{☉}
Radius	3.0 R_{☉}
Luminosity	43 L_{☉}
Surface gravity (log g)	3.83 cgs
Temperature	8,610 K
Rotational velocity (v sin i)	222 km/s
Age	454 Myr

Other designations
- BD+29°2581, FK5 3171, HD 130917, HIP 72552, HR 5532, SAO 83551

Database references
SIMBAD	data

HD 130917 is a single star in the northern constellation of Boötes. It is an A-type main sequence star with a stellar classification of A4V. At an apparent magnitude of 5.80, it is visible to the naked eye under very dark skies.

HD 130917 is over twice as massive as the Sun and hotter at 8,610 K. At an age of 454 million years, it is still on the main sequence but has expanded somewhat to three times the radius of the Sun and is now 43 times more luminous than the Sun.
